Steven Ameche is an American lawyer.

Former lawyer and producer at King World/CBS working directly under President and CEO Roger King. Ameche was counsel to Matthew Katz who was an original plaintiff during the famous Napster copyright infringement litigation of the early 2000s. Former lawyer for the Hertz Investment Group. As an attorney, producer, and/or actor Ameche has worked with Steven Spielberg, Debbie Allen, Roger King, Michael King, Stacy Keach, Kelly Osbourne, Bob Clark, Katy Perry, Ed Marinaro and many others.

References

Year of birth missing (living people)
Living people
University of Central Florida alumni
American filmmakers
American lawyers